The 2016 Arena Football League season was the 29th season in the history of the Arena Football League. Prior to the start of the season, the league contracted to eight teams. The 16-game regular season then began on April 1, 2016 and ended on August 1, 2016. The league, however, kept its eight-team playoff format, which meant that every club qualified for the postseason.

League business

Teams
The Las Vegas Outlaws and the New Orleans VooDoo were dropped from the league at the end of the 2015 season because new ownership groups could not be found for either team. The Spokane Shock jumped to the Indoor Football League on September 1, 2015. The AFL claimed ownership of the Shock name, forcing the team to rename itself the Spokane Empire. On October 30, 2015, the league announced that there would not be any expansion teams for the 2016 season; this event occurred just under three hours before what had been slated to be the expected announcement of an expansion franchise in San Antonio to be owned by the ownership group of the San Antonio Spurs. The group owning the 2015 league champion San Jose SaberCats returned the franchise to the league on November 12, 2015 for "reasons unrelated to League operations". Commissioner Scott Butera said the league would try to find new ownership, but this was not forthcoming in time for the team to operate during the 2016 season to defend its championship. Because the league was now down to eight teams for the 2016 season, there were still the American and National Conferences but no divisional play. The Cleveland Gladiators were moved to the National Conference to maintain a balance between the conferences. The league took over operations of the former Portland Thunder in January 2016 and rebranded it as the Portland Steel. The 2016 schedule was announced on December 10, 2015.

ArenaBowl Playoffs
All teams from both conferences qualified for the playoffs. As in the prior season, there were the Conference Semifinals, the Conference Championships, and ArenaBowl XXIX.

In the American Semifinals, the Soul beat the Storm 63–41 in Allentown, Pennsylvania. The Sharks beat the Predators 69–68 in overtime; the National Semifinals saw the Rattlers beat the Steel 84–40 and the Gladiators beat the Kiss 56–52 in San Diego, California.

The Rattlers doubled up the Gladiators 82–41 in the National Conference title game. In the American Conference title game, the Soul edged the Sharks by a score of 55–50.

The Philadelphia Soul upset the heavily-favored Arizona Rattlers 56–42 in ArenaBowl XXIX in Glendale, Arizona for their second AFL title.

Alignment

Regular season standings

x - Clinched conference title.

Playoffs

Conference semifinals

Conference finals

ArenaBowl XXIX

All-Arena team

References